Henderson County is a county located in the U.S. state of North Carolina. As of the 2020 census, the population was 116,281. Its county seat is Hendersonville.

Henderson County is part of the Asheville Metropolitan Statistical Area.

History

The county was formed in 1838 from the southern part of Buncombe County.  It was named for Leonard Henderson, Chief Justice of the North Carolina Supreme Court from 1829 to 1833. There is no evidence Henderson ever passed through the area.

In 1855 parts of Henderson County and Rutherford County were combined to form Polk County, and in 1861 parts of Henderson County and Jackson County were combined to form Transylvania County.

Henderson County, which in 1861 encompassed present-day Transylvania County as well, contributed 1,296 soldiers to the Confederate States Army out of its approximately 10,000 population, as well as 130 Union troops. (Figures from Terrell T. Garren's "Mountain Myth:  Unionism in Western North Carolina, published 2006).

Henderson County government was centered around Hendersonville in the 1905 county courthouse on Main Street, until this structure was replaced by the new Courthouse (c. 1995) on Grove Street in Hendersonville.

The first rail line reached Hendersonville in 1879, ushering in a new era of access to the outside world.  However, parts of the county had long been known as retreats, including the "Little Charleston" of Flat Rock in which South Carolina's Low Country planter families had maintained second homes since the early 19th century.

A major land boom ensued in the 1920s, culminating in the crash of 1929, which severely deflated prices and left structures such as the Fleetwood Hotel atop Jumpoff Mountain incomplete. Population growth in the county has been rapid since the 1960s as a result of an influx from other states, with many new housing developments changing the face of previously rural areas of the county.

Other notable historic sites in Henderson County include: the Woodfield Inn (1852), Connemara—final home of Carl Sandburg (originally known as Rock Hill, the home of CSA Secretary of the Treasury Christopher Memminger) -- and the St. John in the Wilderness Episcopal Church.   Today, Flat Rock is the site of the main campus of Blue Ridge Community College.

Geography

Henderson County is located in the Blue Ridge Mountains of southwestern North Carolina, on the border with South Carolina. The Eastern Continental Divide, which lies along the crest of the Blue Ridge, passes through the county. The northwestern slope of the Divide is known as the Blue Ridge Plateau and the southeastern slope as the Blue Ridge Escarpment. These two physiographic features have unique characteristics that account for wide variations in the county's climate. According to the U.S. Census Bureau, the county has a total area of 375 square miles (970 km2), of which 373 square miles (970 km2) is land and 2.2 square miles (5.7 km2) (0.6%) is water. The county's largest body of water is Lake Summit, a reservoir impounded by the Duke Power Company for hydroelectric generation. The county's major streams are the French Broad River (whose conjunction with the Holston River forms the Tennessee River, flowing into the Ohio River, the Mississippi River, and eventually the Gulf of Mexico), Mills River, Green River, Little River, Mud Creek, Clear Creek, Cane Creek, Hungry River, and the headwaters of the Broad River (which flows into the Congaree River of South Carolina and eventually into the Atlantic Ocean). The lowest point in the county is found along the Broad River at approximately 1,394 feet at the boundary between Henderson and Rutherford Counties in North Carolina. The high point is located on Little Pisgah Mountain at approximately 5,278 feet along the Henderson-Haywood County boundary in North Carolina (Note that a second Little Pisgah Mountain at 4,412 feet is located at the boundary between Henderson and Buncombe counties in North Carolina).

Landscape and climate
Due to its geographic setting along the Eastern Continental Divide and its extreme topographic variation, Henderson County presents a wide variation in temperature and precipitation conditions.  The highest elevations occur along the northwest and northern boundaries of the county and within the Blue Ridge Escarpment, a rugged area of peaks and narrow valleys that rise from the Piedmont to the continental divide and the Blue Ridge Plateau.  The lowest elevations occur within the valleys of the escarpment and in the broader valleys of the Blue Ridge Plateau. The mean annual temperature of the county is 55.1 °F, with a range from 50.3 to 57.9 °F depending on the elevation, with higher temperatures occurring at lower elevations and lower temperatures in the higher mountains. The month of July is the hottest in the county, with a mean temperature of 72.6 °F and a mean range of 66.6 to 75.8 °F. The coolest month is January with a mean temperature of 36.9 °F and a mean range of 33.3 to 39.5 °F. Precipitation is also correlated to elevation, with higher precipitation normally occurring at higher elevations and lower precipitation in the valleys. The mean annual precipitation of Henderson County is 56.2 inches, with a mean range of 45.04 to 78.03 inches. March has the highest mean precipitation of 5.1 inches, with a mean range of 3.9 to 6.7 inches. The lowest precipitation occurs in October, with a mean value of 3.9 inches and a mean range of 2.8 to 5.8 inches.

Agriculture
Henderson County's topographic and climatic diversity make it ideal for a great variety of commercial crops and agricultural products.  Parts of the county between the Pisgah National Forest on the northwest and the boundary with Polk County on the southeast are often referred to locally as the Crest of the Blue Ridge Agricultural Area in recognition of the region's unique growing conditions. At the present time the fruit and berry types being raised include apples, blackberries, blueberries, cantaloupes, cherries, grapes, peaches, plums, raspberries, strawberries and watermelons.

A special word should be said for Henderson County's apple production.  Since World War II, apples have been the most important agricultural crop in the county; they require extensive winter chilling, and do not tolerate summer heat and humidity well, so Henderson County, with its cooler climate due to its elevation represents an ideal environment for orchards.  Henderson County represents, in fact, the southern limit for large-scale commercial apple production in the eastern United States. The tradition of honoring the local apple industry persists in the county's annual North Carolina Apple Festival, held each year around Labor Day, and culminating in the "King Apple Parade" attended by tens of thousands of spectators. In addition to fruits and berries, a number of commercial vegetable crops are raised in Henderson County, including asparagus, green beans, beets, broccoli, cabbage, cauliflower, carrots, corn, cucumbers, egg plants, greens, herbs, lettuce, mushrooms, okra, onions, peas, peppers (bell and hot), potatoes, pumpkins, radishes, spinach, squash (winter and summer varieties), tomatoes, turnips, and zucchini.  Meat, eggs, and dairy products are also important, with beef, fish, goat meat, mountain trout, pork, poultry, sweet and hard cider, wine and cheese being produced in commercial quantities.

National protected areas 
 Blue Ridge Parkway (part)
 Carl Sandburg Home National Historic Site
 Nantahala National Forest (part)

State and local protected areas 
 Chimney Rock State Park (part)
 DuPont State Recreational Forest (part)
 Florence Nature Preserve
 Green River Game Lands (part)
 Holmes Educational State Forest (part)

Major water bodies 
 Broad River
 French Broad River
 Green River
 Hungry River
 Lake Summit
 Little Hungry River
 South Fork Hoopers Creek
 South Fork Mills River

Adjacent counties
 Buncombe County - north
 Rutherford County - northeast
 Polk County - east
 Greenville County, South Carolina - south
 Transylvania County - west
 Haywood County - northwest

Major highways

Demographics

2020 census

As of the 2020 United States census, there were 116,281 people, 51,115 households, and 33,992 families residing in the county.

2010 census
As of the 2010 census, there were 106,740 people, 45,180 households, and 28,613 families residing in the county.  The population density was 275.83 people per square mile (92 km2).  There were 42,996 housing units at an average density of 115 per square mile (44 km2).  The racial makeup of the county was 94.5% White, 3.3% Black or African American, 0.4% Native American, 0.8% Asian, and .9% from two or more races.  8.7% of the population were Hispanic or Latino of any race. The county has seen a marked increase in its Hispanic population segment and Hispanic culture in recent decades, and has also shared in the higher immigration from the countries of the former USSR experienced by neighboring Buncombe County.

There were 42,205 households, out of which 25.6% had children under the age of 18 living in them, 54.1% were married couples living together, 9.9% had a female householder with no husband present, and 32.2% were non-families. 28.3% of all households were made up of individuals, and 22% had someone living alone who was 65 years of age or older. The average household size was 2.33 persons and the average family size was 2.78 persons.

In the county, the population was spread out, with 20.80% under the age of 18, 6.30% from 18 to 24, 25.9% from 25 to 44, 26.7% from 45 to 64, and 22.5% who were 65 years of age or older. The median age was 46 years. For every 100 females there were 93.80 males. For every 100 females age 18 and over, there were 90.50 males. Henderson County is characterized by an exceptionally large retiree population.

The median income for a household in the county was $43,013 and the median income for a family was $44,974. Males had a median income of $31,845 versus $23,978 for females. The per capita income for the county was $33,500.  About 6.80% of families and 12.9% of the population were below the poverty line, including 14.50% of those under age 18 and 8.30% of those age 65 or over.

Henderson County was historically part of the Cherokee Nation before their removal in the Trail of Tears in 1837–38.

Ancestry
As of 2015, the largest self-reported ancestry groups in Henderson County, North Carolina were:

Religion
 Unaffiliated: 44%
 Baptist: 23%
 Methodist: 5%
 Catholic: 4%
 Presbyterian: 3%
 Anglican: 2%
 Seventh Day Adventist: 2%
 Lutheran: 1%
 Pentecostal: 1%
 Other: 15%

Law and government
Henderson County is a member of the Land-of-Sky Regional Council of governments.  It is governed by the five-member Henderson County Board of Commissioners:
 Grady Hawkins (Chairman)
 William Lapsley, (Vice-Chairman)
 Charles Messer
 Michael Edney
 Rebecca McCall
The County Manager is Steve Wyatt. The Henderson County Planning Department publishes statistical information about the county every October.

In April 2021, the district attorney for Henderson County, Gregory A. Newman, was removed from office for willful misconduct and perjury, notably in a 2015 child rape case.

Politics
Henderson County is located in the 11th Congressional District of North Carolina. The present U. S. Representative is Chuck Edwards.  Both the Henderson County Republican Party and the Henderson County Democratic Party are active, and have their offices in the county seat, Hendersonville. In 2008, there was a vigorous election battle, which witnessed a Democratic surge in what has been historically been one of the more Republican areas of North Carolina.

Since 1880, Henderson County has been carried by a Democrat just five times–Woodrow Wilson in 1912 and Franklin D. Roosevelt in each of his four elections. Since FDR carried the county in 1944, only LBJ in 1964 and Jimmy Carter in 1976 have managed to win more than 40 percent of the vote. Barack Obama came close to that mark in 2008 as part of the Democratic surge in the area, and Joseph Biden came closer still in 2020, winning 39.8%.

Political news and civic affairs are covered by the county's daily newspaper, the Times-News of Hendersonville.

Communities

Cities
 Hendersonville (county seat and largest city)
 Saluda

Towns
 Fletcher
 Laurel Park
 Mills River

Village
 Flat Rock

Census-designated places

 Balfour
 Barker Heights
 Dana
 East Flat Rock
 Edneyville
 Etowah
 Fruitland
 Gerton
 Hoopers Creek
 Horse Shoe
 Mountain Home
 Valley Hill

Unincorporated communities
 Bat Cave
 Bearwallow
 Chestnut Hill
 Mountain Page
 Naples
 Tuxedo
 Zirconia

Townships

 Blue Ridge
 Clear Creek
 Crab Creek
 Edneyville
 Green River
 Hendersonville
 Hoopers Creek
 Mills River

See also
 List of counties in North Carolina
 National Register of Historic Places listings in Henderson County, North Carolina
 North Carolina State Parks
 List of North Carolina state forests
 National Park Service
 Asheville Regional Airport, Regional airport directly located north in Buncombe County.

References

Further reading
 Jody Barber and Louise Howe Bailey, Hendersonville and Henderson County: A Pictorial History. Norfolk, VA: Donning Co., 1988.
 James T. Fain, Henderson County — The Past 137 Years: A Chronicle of the History of Hendersonville and Henderson County Featuring Original Photographs Depicting our Area and its People. Hendersonville, NC: Times-News Co., 1976.

External links

 
 
 Henderson County Visitors Center
 Henderson County Partnership for Economic Development

 
Asheville metropolitan area
Counties of Appalachia
1838 establishments in North Carolina
Populated places established in 1838